Sherman High School is the public high school serving Seth and part of southeastern Boone County in the state of West Virginia.

The school has 416 students by the count of the WVSSAC, placing it in class "A". The school colors are maroon and gold and the nickname is "Tide", which is expressed with nautical themes, despite the location of the school in the Appalachian mountains.

The school was named for William Tecumseh Sherman, a United States Civil War general.

Notable alumni 
 Josh Holstein, member of the West Virginia House of Delegates

References

External links
 

Public high schools in West Virginia
Buildings and structures in Boone County, West Virginia
Education in Boone County, West Virginia